Hebia parafacialis is a Chinese species of tachinid fly in the genus Elodia of the family Tachinidae.

References

Exoristinae
Diptera of Asia
Insects described in 1992